A Turma do Balão Mágico is the second studio album by Brazilian band  Turma do Balão Mágico, released on September 9, 1983, by CBS Records. Superfantástico is the most well known song by Turma do Balão Mágico. According to   Veja, the album sold 1.1 million copies by January 4, 1984.

Track List 
Side A
 "Superfantástico" ("Super Fantástico")
 "Ai Meu Nariz!" ("Tengo un Grano en la Nariz")
 "Ursinho Pimpão" ("Mi Osito Pelón")
 "O Meu Avô" ("Abuelito")
 "Você e Eu" ("Tu y Yo")
Side B
 "Seu Felipe, Dorminhoco" ("Felipito, el dormilon")
 "Juntos" ("Juntos") (featuring Baby Consuelo)
 "Gaguejei" ("Tartamudeo")
 "Amigo e Companheiro" ("Amigo y Compañero, Mi Maestro")
 "Mãe-Iê"

Bibliography
Barcinski, André (2014). Pavões Misteriosos — 1974-1983: A explosão da música pop no Brasil. São Paulo: Editora Três Estrelas.  (

References 

1983 albums
Portuguese-language albums
Sony Music Brazil albums
CBS Records albums